Pterophylla is a genus of trees of the family Cunoniaceae, with species found growing naturally in Madagascar, Malesia, and the Pacific Islands, formerly included in Weinmannia.

The genus was first described by David Don in 1830. It is often treated as a synonym of Weinmannia.

A phylogenomic study by Pillon et al. (2021) concluded that Weinmannia was paraphyletic, and formed two distinct clades. The species belonging to the four Old World sections – Fasciculatae, Inspersae, Spicatae, and Leiospermum – formed a monophyletic group, which is sister to the Old World genera Cunonia and Pancheria. Section Weinmannia, which includes species from the Americas and the Mascarene Islands, is sister to the Old World assemblage. They proposed placing the four Old World sections into the revived genus Pterophylla, with genus Weinmannia limited to the American and Mascarene species in section Weinmannia.

Species
There are 63 accepted species:

 Pterophylla affinis (A.Gray) Pillon & H.C.Hopkins – Fiji and Samoa
 Pterophylla aggregata (Z.S.Rogers & J.Bradford) J.Bradford & Z.S.Rogers – Madagascar
 Pterophylla aphanoneura (Airy Shaw) Pillon & H.C.Hopkins – Borneo
 Pterophylla arguta (Bernardi) J.Bradford & Z.S.Rogers – Madagascar
 Pterophylla bojeriana (Tul.) J.Bradford & Z.S.Rogers – Madagascar
 Pterophylla bradfordii (I.M.Turner) J.Bradford & Z.S.Rogers - Madagascar
 Pterophylla celebica (Koord.) Pillon & H.C.Hopkins – Sulawesi
 Pterophylla commersonii (Bernardi) J.Bradford & Z.S.Rogers – Madagascar
 Pterophylla comorensis (Tul.) J.Bradford & Z.S.Rogers – Comoros
 Pterophylla coodei (H.C.Hopkins) Pillon & H.C.Hopkins – Sulawesi
 Pterophylla croftii (H.C.Hopkins) Pillon & H.C.Hopkins – Bismarck Archipelago
 Pterophylla decora (Tul.) J.Bradford & Z.S.Rogers - Madagascar
 Pterophylla denhamii (Seem.) Pillon & H.C.Hopkins – Vanuatu
 Pterophylla descombesiana (Bernardi) Pillon & H.C.Hopkins – Sulawesi
 Pterophylla devogelii (H.C.Hopkins) Pillon & H.C.Hopkins – Sulawesi
 Pterophylla dichotoma (Brongn. & Gris) Pillon & H.C.Hopkins – New Caledonia
 Pterophylla eriocarpa (Tul.) J.Bradford & Z.S.Rogers – Madagascar
 Pterophylla exigua (A.C.Sm.) Pillon & H.C.Hopkins – Fiji (Vanua Levu)
 Pterophylla eymana (H.C.Hopkins) Pillon & H.C.Hopkins – Sulawesi
 Pterophylla fraxinea D.Don – Malay Peninsula, Borneo, Sumatra, Java, Lesser Sunda Islands, Maluku Islands, New Guinea, Solomon Islands.
 Pterophylla furfuracea (H.C.Hopkins) Pillon & H.C.Hopkins – Sulawesi and Maluku Islands
 Pterophylla henricorum (Bernardi) J.Bradford & Z.S.Rogers – Madagascar
 Pterophylla hepaticarum (Bernardi) J.Bradford & Z.S.Rogers – Madagascar
 Pterophylla hildebrandtii (Baill.) J.Bradford & Z.S.Rogers – Madagascar
 Pterophylla hooglandii (H.C.Hopkins & J.Bradford) Pillon & H.C.Hopkins – Malay Peninsula
 Pterophylla humbertiana (Bernardi) J.Bradford & Z.S.Rogers – Madagascar
 Pterophylla humblotii (Baill.) J.Bradford & Z.S.Rogers – Madagascar
 Pterophylla hutchinsonii (Merr.) Pillon & H.C.Hopkins – Philippines
 Pterophylla icacifolia (Bernardi) J.Bradford & Z.S.Rogers – northern and eastern Madagascar
 Pterophylla louveliana (Bernardi) J.Bradford & Z.S.Rogers – Madagascar
 Pterophylla lowryana (J.Bradford) J.Bradford & Z.S.Rogers – Madagascar
 Pterophylla lucens (Baker) J.Bradford & Z.S.Rogers – Madagascar
 Pterophylla lucida (Merr.) Pillon & H.C.Hopkins – Philippines (Luzon and Samar)
 Pterophylla luzoniensis (S.Vidal) Pillon & H.C.Hopkins – Philippines (Luzon)
 Pterophylla macgillivrayi (Seem.) Pillon & H.C.Hopkins – Vanuatu
 Pterophylla madagascariensis (DC. ex Ser.) J.Bradford & Z.S.Rogers – eastern Madagascar
 Pterophylla mammea (Bernardi) J.Bradford & Z.S.Rogers – Madagascar
 Pterophylla marojejyensis (J.S.Mill. & J.Bradford) J.Bradford & Z.S.Rogers – Madagascar
 Pterophylla marquesana (F.Br.) Pillon & H.C.Hopkins – Marquesas Islands
 Pterophylla minutiflora (Baker) J.Bradford & Z.S.Rogers – Madagascar
 Pterophylla negrosensis (Elmer) Pillon & H.C.Hopkins – Philippines and Sulawesi
 Pterophylla ouaiemensis (Guillaumin & Virot) Pillon & H.C.Hopkins – northern New Caledonia
 Pterophylla paitensis (Schltr.) Pillon & H.C.Hopkins – central and southeastern New Caledonia
 Pterophylla parviflora (G.Forst.) Pillon & H.C.Hopkins – Society Islands
 Pterophylla pauciflora (J.Bradford) J.Bradford & Z.S.Rogers – Madagascar
 Pterophylla pullei (Schltr.) Pillon & H.C.Hopkins – New Guinea
 Pterophylla purpurea (L.M.Perry) Pillon & H.C.Hopkins – Bougainville Island
 Pterophylla racemosa (L.f.) Pillon & H.C.Hopkins – New Zealand
 Pterophylla raiateensis (J.W.Moore) Pillon & H.C.Hopkins – Raiatea
 Pterophylla rakotomalazana (J.Bradford) J.Bradford & Z.S.Rogers – Madagascar
 Pterophylla rapensis (F.Br.) Pillon & H.C.Hopkins – Rapa Iti
 Pterophylla richii (A.Gray) Pillon & H.C.Hopkins – Fiji
 Pterophylla rutenbergii (Engl.) J.Bradford & Z.S.Rogers – Madagascar
 Pterophylla samoensis (A.Gray) Pillon & H.C.Hopkins – Rarotonga
 Pterophylla sanguisugarum (Bernardi) J.Bradford & Z.S.Rogers – Madagascar
 Pterophylla serrata (Brongn. & Gris) Pillon & H.C.Hopkins – New Caledonia
 Pterophylla stenostachya (Baker) J.Bradford & Z.S.Rogers – Madagascar
 Pterophylla sylvicola (Sol. ex A.Cunn.) Pillon & H.C.Hopkins – New Zealand North Island
 Pterophylla tremuloides (H.C.Hopkins & J.Florence) Pillon & H.C.Hopkins – Marquesas (Fatu Hiva)
 Pterophylla urdanetensis (Elmer) Pillon & H.C.Hopkins – Philippines and Papuasia
 Pterophylla venusta (Bernardi) J.Bradford & Z.S.Rogers – Madagascar
 Pterophylla vescoi (Drake) Pillon & H.C.Hopkins – Society Islands (Raiatea and Tahiti)
 Pterophylla ysabelensis (L.M.Perry) Pillon & H.C.Hopkins – Solomon Islands (Santa Isabel Island)

References

Cunoniaceae
Oxalidales genera
Taxa described in 1830
Taxa named by David Don